Thirteen Oaks, also known as the Lovett Warren Farm, is a historic home and farm complex and national historic district located near Newton Grove, Sampson County, North Carolina.  The house was built in 1902, and is a two-story, three bay by two bay, heavy timber frame I-house dwelling. The front facade features a full-width hip roofed porch with Folk Victorian decorative elements. Also on the property are the contributing corn crib, barn, and the family cemetery.

It was added to the National Register of Historic Places in 1990.

References

Farms on the National Register of Historic Places in North Carolina
Historic districts on the National Register of Historic Places in North Carolina
Houses completed in 1902
Buildings and structures in Sampson County, North Carolina
National Register of Historic Places in Sampson County, North Carolina